Joseph Marshall (24 April 1862 – 15 January 1913) was an English cricketer who played first-class cricket for Derbyshire in 1887. He also played football for Derby County.

Cricket career
Marshall was born in Ripley, Derbyshire. He made his debut for Derbyshire in the 1887 season against Surrey and his only other first-class game was also against Surrey that season. After Derbyshire lost first-class status, Marshall continued to play for the club with single games in the 1888 season and 1890 season. Marshall was a right-handed batsman and played four innings in two first-class matches with a top score of 31 and an average of 12.50.

Marshall died in Derby at the age of 50.

Football career
His football career started with Staveley. By 1887 Derby County had signed Marshall as a first-team goalkeeper. Joseph Marshall made his League debut on 8 September 1888, playing as a goalkeeper, at Pike's Lane the then home of Bolton Wanderers. Derby County defeated the home team 6–3. Joseph Marshall was Derby County' oldest player from his League debut on 8  September 1888, until 29 September 1888 when he was surpassed, in age, by Levi Wright. As a goalkeeper (16 appearances) he played in a Derby County defence that achieved one clean–sheet and restricted the opposition to one–League–goal–in–a–match on three separate occasions.

Marshall left Derby County in 1889 and he joined Derby Junction.

References

1862 births
1913 deaths
English cricketers
Derbyshire cricketers
English footballers
Derby County F.C. players
English Football League players
People from Ripley, Derbyshire
Footballers from Derbyshire
Cricketers from Derbyshire
Staveley F.C. players
Derby Junction F.C. players
Association football goalkeepers